Bibi Nshimba also Bibi Amos (born August 18, 1976) is a Congolese-American actress, producer and writer.

Career
In the TV Series created by Shane Brennan, NCIS: Los Angeles, first released in 2009 and featured on CBS, she was featured as Receptionist in 1 Episode, 2014.

In 2012, she wrote, produced and starred in the short drama film, Ben and Becca, as "Rebecca", a medical student from Africa. The film also featured Brian Krause as "Ben" and was directed by Victor Alferi.

She featured in the 2016 TV series directed by Neil Druckmann and Bruce Straley titled, Uncharted 4: A Thief's End, as one of the "Additional Voices".

In 2018, she co-directed a short drama film title, True Faith, alongside Prince Steven Obeni Bottan in which she acted the role of "Angelica". Other cast include Vanessa Bisono, Andrey Bereza and Tito Londole.

Filmatography

Films

Television Series

References

External links
 Bibi Nshimba on IMDb
 Bibi Nshimba on Notre Cinéma
 Bibi Nshimba on Backstage
 Bibi Nshimba on Lacasting
 Bibi Nshimba on Mubi
 Bibi Nshimba on Metacritic
 Bibi Amos on IMDb

Living people
American people of Democratic Republic of the Congo descent
1976 births
21st-century American actresses
21st-century American writers
American film actresses
American television actresses
21st-century African-American writers